Auf Wiedersehen My Pet is a British television series that began airing on ITV on 17 March 2014. The series was produced by Shine Limited, with the first series airing for 20 episodes.

Format
Each episode sees one pet owner who for genuine personal reasons have to make the tough decision to give up their much-loved animals.

Episode guide

References

External links
ITV.com website

2014 British television series debuts